William Henry Mackie (19 November 1799 – 24 November 1860) was an early settler of the Swan River Colony holding a number of public positions including that of the first Judge of the colony.  Mackie was born at Cochin, India and as a child returned to live in Derry before attending school in Twickenham, Middlesex.  He later entered Trinity College, Cambridge and became a member of the Inner Temple in November 1822.

Mackie was a cousin of Captain Frederick Irwin who was the commandant of the troops in the colony and who had arrived on  four months earlier.

Mackie and Irwin acquired two large land grants in the new colony, jointly taking up  at Henley Park in the Upper Swan and another  between Beverley and York.

Mackie's legal background saw him appointed as one of eight Justices of the Peace by Lieutenant-Governor Stirling in December 1829.  In October 1831 Stirling appointed Mackie as one of the foundation members of the Western Australian Legislative Council in the position of Advocate-General.  In June 1834 he resigned from the Council and became the Commissioner of the Civil Court, thus presiding over the civil and criminal courts of the colony.

South Australian Governor George Grey (later to become Governor of New Zealand) offered him the position of Advocate-General of South Australia in 1841, but Mackie declined.  In August 1842 he was made a nominee member of the Legislative Council.  As chairman of the magistrates, Mackie was instrumental in formulating much of the early legislature of the new State including provision for the introduction of penalties relating to the introduction of convicts in 1850.

He retired as a result of poor health in 1857 and died in 1860 at the age of 62 at Henley Park. He is buried at nearby All Saints Church, Henley Brook.  Mackie never married.

External links

1799 births
1860 deaths
Attorneys-General of Western Australia
Colony of Western Australia judges
Members of the Western Australian Legislative Council
Settlers of Western Australia
19th-century Australian politicians
19th-century Australian judges